William H. Bossert (born 1937) is an American mathematician. He is the David B. Arnold, Jr. Professor of Science, Emeritus at Harvard University. He was the housemaster of Lowell House for 23 years.  He received his PhD from Harvard in 1963.

Publications
With Edward O. Wilson A primer of population biology (1971)

References

1937 births
Living people
American mathematicians
Harvard University faculty
Harvard University alumni